Nicole den Dulk (born 23 April 1980) is a Paralympic equestrian.

She became paraplegic in 2013 after a riding accident.

She competed at the 2016 Paralympic Games where she won a bronze medal in the team event alongside Frank Hosmar, Rixt van der Horst and Demi Vermeulen.

References

1980 births
Living people
Belgian dressage riders
Belgian female equestrians
Dutch dressage riders
Dutch female equestrians
Paralympic equestrians of the Netherlands
Paralympic bronze medalists for the Netherlands
Equestrians at the 2016 Summer Paralympics
Medalists at the 2016 Summer Paralympics
Paralympic medalists in equestrian
People with paraplegia
21st-century Dutch women
21st-century Belgian women